James Nicholas McGegan OBE (born 14 January 1950 in Sawbridgeworth, Hertfordshire, England) is a British harpsichordist, flutist, conductor and early music expert.

Biography
McGegan received his early education at Nottingham High School. He subsequently studied music at Corpus Christi College, Cambridge and at Magdalen College, Oxford. McGegan has participated in some of the earliest "authentic-performance" recordings during the 1970s as a baroque flautist, including Christopher Hogwood's seminal recordings of Mozart symphonies. He has taught music at such UK institutions as King's College, Cambridge, Oriel College, Oxford, and the Royal College of Music. From 1993 to 1998, he was Principal Guest Conductor of the Scottish Opera in Glasgow.

In the US, McGegan has served as artist-in-residence at Washington University in St. Louis, beginning in 1979, when he was initially scheduled for one semester in residence, but continued until 1985. McGegan first guest-conducted the St. Louis Symphony in 1986, and has since returned continuously as a guest conductor. In 1985, McGegan became music director of the Philharmonia Baroque Orchestra in San Francisco and Berkeley, California. In 1988, he served as Music Director of the Ojai Music Festival alongside Peter Maxwell Davies and Diane Wittry. Since 2013, he has been Principal Guest Conductor of the Pasadena Symphony. In October 2018, the Philharmonia Baroque Orchestra announced that McGegan is to stand down as its music director after the 2019–20 season, becoming music director laureate.

From 1991 to 2011, McGegan was Artistic Director of the Göttingen International Handel Festival. He was music director of the Irish Chamber Orchestra from 2002 to 2005. In 2014, he became Artist-in-Association with the Adelaide Symphony Orchestra. He has also held long-term appointments with the Drottningholm Theatre, where he served as principal conductor from 1993 to 1996, the Milwaukee Symphony Orchestra, and the Saint Paul Chamber Orchestra. McGegan also founded the chamber music group the Arcadian Academy.

McGegan has made more than 100 recordings, including many with Philharmonia Baroque and singers such as Lorraine Hunt Lieberson and Lisa Saffer, for such labels as Philharmonia Baroque Productions and harmonia mundi. He was nominated for a Grammy Award for his 2011 release on the orchestra's label of Joseph Haydn's Symphonies nos. 88, 101, and 104.

McGegan resides in Berkeley, California and Glasgow. He has collected a number of honors, including an honorary degree from the Royal College of Music in London; the Handel Prize from the Handel Festival in Halle, Germany; the honorary medal of the Friends of the Drottningholm Theatre; the Order of Merit of the State of Lower Saxony (Germany); the Medal of Honor of the City of Göttingen; and a declaration of Nicholas McGegan Day by the mayor of San Francisco in recognition of his work with Philharmonia Baroque. He was appointed Officer of the Order of the British Empire (OBE) in the 2010 Birthday Honours.

References

External links
 Official Nicholas McGegan website
 harmonia mundi page on Nicholas McGegan
 Philharmonia Baroque Orchestra web site
 Interview with Nicholas McGegan, 19 July 1988
 Rayfield Allied Biography

1950 births
English choral conductors
British male conductors (music)
English classical flautists
British harpsichordists
Living people
People from Sawbridgeworth
British performers of early music
Officers of the Order of the British Empire
People educated at Nottingham High School
Musicians from Hertfordshire
Handel Prize winners
Alumni of Corpus Christi College, Cambridge
21st-century British conductors (music)
21st-century British male musicians
21st-century flautists
Washington University in St. Louis faculty